Seh₂ul and Meh₁not are the reconstructed Proto-Indo-European goddess of the Sun and god of the Moon. *Seh₂ul is reconstructed based on the solar deities of the attested Indo-European mythologies, although its gender (male or female) is disputed, since there are deities of both genders. Likewise, *Meh₁not- is reconstructed based on the lunar deities of the daughter languages, but they differ in regards to their gender.

The daily course of *Seh₂ul across the sky on a horse-driven chariot is a common motif among Indo-European myths. While it is probably inherited, the motif certainly appeared after the introduction of the wheel in the Pontic–Caspian steppe about 3500 BC, and is therefore a late addition to Proto-Indo-European culture.

The Sun deity 

*Seh₂ul is reconstructed based on the Greek god Helios, the Greek mythological figure Helen of Troy, the Roman god Sol, the Celtic goddess Sulis / Sul/Suil, the North Germanic goddess Sól, the Continental Germanic goddess *Sowilō, the Hittite goddess "UTU-liya", the Zoroastrian Hvare-khshaeta and the Vedic god Surya.

In the mythologies of the daughter languages (namely, Baltic, Greek and Old Indic), the sun deity crosses the sky in a horse-driven chariot or wagon. However, Mallory and Adams caution that the motif is not exclusively Indo-European, and mention evidence of its presence in Mesopotamia.

A character related to the Sun deity is the 'Sun-maiden'. Mallory and Adams cite as examples 'Saules meita', the daughter of Saulé in Baltic tradition, and Sūryā, daughter to Indic Sun god Sūrya. However, both scholars, as well as Martin L. West, also posit Helen of Troy, from Greek mythology, was another example of the 'Sun-maiden'.

The Moon deity 

*Meh₁not- is reconstructed based on the Norse god Máni, the Slavic god Myesyats, and the Lithuanian god *Meno, or Mėnuo (Mėnulis). Remnants of the lunar deity may exist in Latvian moon god Mēness, Anatolian (Phrygian) deity Men; Mene, another name for Selene, and in Zoroastrian lunar deity Mah (Måŋha).

Alternative myth 

Although the sun was personified as an independent, female deity, the Proto-Indo-Europeans also visualized the sun as the "lamp of Dyēws" or the "eye of Dyēws", as seen in various reflexes: "the god's lamp" in Medes by Euripides, "heaven's candle" in Beowulf, or "the land of Hatti's torch", as the Sun-goddess of Arinna is called in a Hittite prayer; and Helios as the eye of Zeus, Hvare-khshaeta as the eye of Ahura Mazda, and the sun as "God's eye" in Romanian folklore. The names of Celtic sun goddesses like Sulis and Grian may also allude to this association: the words for "eye" and "sun" are switched in these languages, hence the name of the goddesses.

Egyptian mythology is not an Indo European mythology so there is unlikely any historical link, but the metaphor of Eye of Ra was used in it too.

See also 

 Eye of Ra

Notes

References

Sources

Proto-Indo-European deities
Reconstructed words
Proto-Indo-European mythology